A. Devegowda is an Indian politician who belongs to the Bharatiya Janata Party. As of February 2023, he is currently a member of the Karnataka Legislative Council from 22 June 2018, from the Bangalore Graduates constituency.

References

 https://www.ndtv.com/karnataka-news/bjp-wins-3-of-6-karnataka-legislative-council-seats-jds-congress-gets-rest-1867133

Members of the Karnataka Legislative Council
Bharatiya Janata Party politicians from Karnataka